This is a list of members of the Western Australian Legislative Assembly between the 1939 election and the 1943 election, together known as the 17th Parliament.

Notes
 On 29 March 1939, Aubrey Coverley, the member for Kimberley was appointed as Minister for the North-West in the Willcock Ministry, whilst Emil Nulsen, the member for Kanowna, was appointed Minister for Justice and Minister for Railways. Both were therefore required to resign and contest ministerial by-elections on 5 April 1939, in which both were returned unopposed.
 On 20 March 1939, the Labor member for Forrest, May Holman, died after a car crash. Her brother, Edward Holman, won the resulting by-election on 20 May 1939—the third family member in a row to hold the seat, as their father, John Holman, had held it from a 1923 by-election until his death in 1925.
 On 2 August 1939, the Independent member for Irwin-Moore, Claude Barker, resigned. The Independent candidate, Horace Berry, won the resulting by-election on 9 September 1939.
 On 30 June 1941, the Labor member for Yilgarn-Coolgardie, George Lambert, died. Independent Country candidate Lionel Kelly won the resulting by-election on 9 August 1941.
 On 7 October 1942, the Country member for York, Charles Latham, resigned after being appointed to fill a Senate vacancy. Country candidate Charles Perkins won the resulting by-election on 21 November 1942.
 On 15 July 1943, the Independent member for East Perth, Thomas Hughes, resigned to contest the Federal seat of Perth at the 1943 federal election. Labor candidate Herb Graham won the resulting by-election on 14 August 1943.

Members of Western Australian parliaments by term